John Kelly (born 1948) is an Irish retired hurler who played as a full-back for the Tipperary senior team.

Kelly joined the team during the 1968 championship and was a regular member of the starting fifteen until his retirement after the 1975 championship. During that time he won one All-Ireland medal and one Munster medal.

At club level Kelly enjoyed a lengthy career with Cappawhite, UCC and Kilruane MacDonaghs.

References

1948 births
Living people
Cappawhite hurlers
UCC hurlers
Kilruane MacDonaghs hurlers
Tipperary inter-county hurlers
Munster inter-provincial hurlers
All-Ireland Senior Hurling Championship winners